Paniegekko is a monotypic genus of geckos in the family Diplodactylidae, containing the species Paniegekko madjo. It is endemic to humid montane forests on Mont Ignambi and Mont Panié in the Panié massif of New Caledonia. It was once considered a species of Bavayia, a similar genus of arboreal geckos. Paniegekko madjo is endangered, owing to predation by introduced rodents and cats combined with habitat degradation by wildfires and introduced pigs (Sus domesticus) and deer (Rusa timorensis). It has not been observed since 1998.

References

Diplodactylidae
Geckos of New Caledonia
Taxa named by Aaron M. Bauer
Taxa named by Todd R. Jackman
Taxa named by Ross Allen Sadlier
Taxa named by Anthony Whitaker
Monotypic lizard genera